Peter Christen Asbjørnsen (15 January 18125 January 1885) was a Norwegian writer and scholar. He and Jørgen Engebretsen Moe were collectors of Norwegian folklore. They were so closely united in their lives' work that their folk tale collections are commonly mentioned only as "Asbjørnsen and Moe".

Background

Peter Christen Asbjørnsen was born in Christiania (now Oslo), Norway. He was descended from a family originating at Otta in the traditional district of Gudbrandsdal, which is believed to have come to an end with his death. He became a student at the University of Oslo in 1833, but as early as 1832, in his twentieth year, he had begun to collect and write down fairy tales and legends. He later walked on foot the length and breadth of Norway, adding to his stories.

Jørgen Moe, who was born in Ringerike, met Asbjørnsen first when he was fourteen years old, while they were both attending high school at Norderhov Rectory. The building is today the site of Ringerikes Museum, the local museum for the Ringerike region, and contains memorabilia from both Asbjørnsen and Moe. They developed a lifelong friendship. In 1834 Asbjørnsen discovered that Moe had started independently on a search for the relics of national folklore; the friends eagerly compared their results, and determined for the future to work in concert.

Career

Asbjørnsen became by profession a zoologist, and with the aid of the University of Oslo made a series of investigative voyages along the coasts of Norway, particularly in the Hardangerfjord. He worked with two of the most famous marine biologists of their time: Michael Sars and his son Georg Ossian Sars. Moe, meanwhile, having left the University of Oslo in 1839, had devoted himself to the study of theology, and was making a living as a tutor in Christiania. In his holidays he wandered through the mountains, in the most remote districts, collecting stories. In these years he laid the foundation for the great literary its output.

A second volume was published in 1844 and a new collection in 1871.

In 1845 Asbjørnsen also published, without help from Moe, a collection of Norwegian fairy tales. In 1856 Asbjørnsen called attention to the deforestation of Norway, and he induced the government to act on this issue. He was appointed forest-master, and was sent through Norway to examine in various countries of the north of Europe the methods observed for the preservation of timber.   In 1876, he retired from these duties with a pension. In 1879 he sold his large collection of zoological specimens to the Natural History Museum (Ireland) for £300. This collection includes specimens of Brisinga endecacnemos, possibly collected during his biological survey of the Hardangerfjord in the 1850s. He was made a member of the Royal Norwegian Society of Sciences in Trondheim. He died in Christiania in 1885.

Writing style
It was usually said of their work that the vigour came from Asbjørnsen and the charm from Moe, but the fact seems to be that from the long habit of writing in unison they had come to adopt almost precisely identical modes of literary expression.

Legacy
In the 20th century, Norwegian filmmaker Ivo Caprino made a series of puppet films based on the fairy tales of Asbjørnsen and Moe. Asbjørnsen is featured in the introduction to each film. Caprino also built a theme park in  near Lillehammer where these fairy tales play a central role.

Since 2008 Asbjørnsen has appeared on the reverse of the Norwegian 50 krone banknote.

Gallery

See also
Storytelling

References

Attribution

Other sources
Gjefsen, Truls  Peter Christen Asbjørnsen – diger og folkesæl (Andresen & Butenschøn. Oslo: 2001)
Liestøl, Knut P. Chr. Asbjørnsen. Mannen og livsverket. (Johan Grundt Tanum. Oslo: 1947)

External links

 Digitized books by Asbjørnsen in the National Library of Norway
 
 
 
 English translation of Norske Folkeeventyr: "Popular Tales From the Norse" translated by George Webbe Dasent, Third Edition, 1888 
 

Collectors of fairy tales
Norwegian folklorists
1812 births
1885 deaths
Scandinavian folklore
University of Oslo alumni
19th-century Norwegian writers
Norwegian marine biologists
19th-century Norwegian male writers
Burials at the Cemetery of Our Saviour